Petar Cucić (born 18 March 1935) is a Yugoslav wrestler. He competed in the men's Greco-Roman light heavyweight at the 1964 Summer Olympics.

References

1935 births
Living people
Yugoslav male sport wrestlers
Olympic wrestlers of Yugoslavia
Wrestlers at the 1964 Summer Olympics
Place of birth missing (living people)